Arimitsu is a Japanese surname. Notable people with the surname include:

, Japanese footballer
, Japanese diver

See also
Akimitsu

Japanese-language surnames